Gaston Dufresne (September 9, 1898 – December 6, 1998) was the principal bassist in the Boston Symphony Orchestra from 1927 to 1957 and with the Florida West Coast Symphony from 1963 to 1979. He also taught solfège, a singing technique used to teach pitch. Among his contrabass students were American composer Leroy Anderson and Boston Symphony principal trumpeter Roger Voisin. Dufresne taught solfège to Voisin and to Boston Symphony hornist Richard Mackey.

Dufresne wrote Develop Sight Reading, a book of progressive sight reading studies which has been transcribed for use by all orchestral instruments.
Dufresne was born 9 September 1898 in Lille, France and died on 6 December 1998 in  Sarasota, Florida.

References

French classical double-bassists
Male double-bassists
1898 births
1998 deaths
Musicians from Lille
French centenarians
20th-century classical musicians
20th-century French musicians
20th-century double-bassists
20th-century French male musicians
Men centenarians